Polonia Bydgoszcz is a Polish sports club based in Bydgoszcz most known for its speedway team ŻKS Polonia Bydgoszcz which currently races in the 1. Liga. The club has won the Polish Speedway League Championship seven times, the latest in 2002, and European Team Championship three times, the latest in 2001. The club also has a football team that plays in the lower leagues, though it was more successful in the past.

History 
BKS Polonia Bydgoszcz was founded on May 14, 1920, by Edmund Szyc, a sports enthusiast and an official of Warta Poznan. Szyc, who had come to Bydgoszcz from Poznan in the early spring of 1920, wanted to create a sports organization with a patriotic spirit, based on Polish Army soldiers garrisoned in the city. The color scheme of Polonia was white-red-green (to commemorate Polish flag, plus green, the traditional colour of Warta Poznan’s jerseys).

In the Second Polish Republic, Polonia Bydgoszcz was one of the largest sports organizations in the nation. It had several departments, such as football, track and field, boxing, ice hockey, cycling, basketball, handball and volleyball. Among the most notable athletes of the time were: Stanislaw Zakrzewski (high jumper), Klemens Biniakowski (runner, who participated in the 1928 Summer Olympics), Feliks Wiecek (cyclist, winner of the 1928 Tour de Pologne). Polonia’s football team were four times champions of Polish Pomerania, but failed to win promotion to the Ekstraklasa.

After World War II, Polonia was reactivated on October 21, 1945. In 1947, its football team once again won local championships. On May 22, 1946, the speedway department was formed, but in 1949, the so-called First Polonia was dissolved by the Communist authorities, who disliked its prewar, bourgeoisie roots.

In 1949-57, Polonia Bydgoszcz did not exist. On May 24, 1957, BKS Polonia and ZS Gwardia (sports organization supported by Milicja Obywatelska) merged into Milicyjny KS Polonia. The new club took over the traditions of the 1920 organization and quickly emerged as one of the most important sports clubs of the country. Former Gwardia Bydgoszcz was a powerful organization, with a top class football team (promoted to Ekstraklasa in 1953), while its speedway team was the 1955 Champion of Poland. Furthermore, several Gwardia’s track and fielders took part in the 1952 Olympic Games in Helsinki. In the early 1950s, Gwardia had as many as 17 departments. Its most famous sports personality of that time was tennis player Jadwiga Jedrzejowska.

The newly established Militia Sports Club Polonia Bydgoszcz took over Gwardia’s hues (red - white - blue), to commemorate the colors of the French Revolution, and to symbolize the new, Communist regime of Poland. In 1962, the name of the club was changed into Bydgoszcz Sports Club (BKS) Polonia, to be changed into Guards Sports Club (GKS) Polonia in 1974. Finally, in 1990, the name Bydgoszcz Sports Club Polonia was returned.

In the late 1980s, GKS Polonia had over 1500 members, including 700 athletes. In 1990, the police authority (former Milicja Obywatelska) withdrew its financial support of the club. As a result, the club was supported by the city government. In 1992, the football team was closed to return in 1994, and the ice hockey department was separated from the organization. In the same year, the speedway team of Polonia won Polish Championship.

By the late 1990s, Polonia had returned to its former glory. Speedway team, with Tomasz Gollob, was three times Polish champion (1998, 2000, 2002), table tennis team was among the best in the country, and football team won promotion to the third level.

In 2003, local authorities dissolved Polonia Bydgoszcz. The departments of the former organization created their own teams, such as Zuzlowy Klub Sportowy (Speedway Sports Club) Polonia, and the traditions of BKS Polonia are continued by the football team, called Klub Pilkarski (Football Club) Polonia.

Names 
 1993-1998: Jutrzenka Polonia Bydgoszcz 
 2001: Bractwo Polonia Bydgoszcz 
 2002: PointS Polonia Bydgoszcz 
 2003: Plusssz Polonia Bydgoszcz 
 2004-2006: Budlex Polonia Bydgoszcz
 2013: Składywęgla.pl Polonia Bydgoszcz
 2019: Zooleszcz Polonia Bydgoszcz
 2020-:Abramczyk Polonia Bydgoszcz

Management 
Polonia Bydgoszcz since 27 October  2006 is Joint stock company (pl: spółka akcyjna or S.A.).
board of directors:
President: Leszek Tillinger
supervisory board:
President: Bartosz Rakoczy
Members: Bogdan Sawarski and Roman Woźniak
annual general meeting:
80 % - BTŻ Polonia Bydgoszcz (Voluntary association)
20 % - City Bydgoszcz

Speedway section

History
The Klub Sportowy "Polonia" (Sport's Club "Polonia") was created in 1920 and the  motorcycle section in 1946. The team participated in the first Team Speedway Polish Championship during the 1948 finishing 3rd in the second division.

The team won the second division in 1949 and in 1951 won the silver medal in the first division. During the 1950s the club became a major force medalling four more times including winning the league and gold medal in winning the 1955.

In 1971 the team won their second gold medal and they won the Polish Pairs Speedway Championship in 1974. Bolesław Proch won the Golden Helmet in 1981. Former rider and coach at the time Mieczysław Połukard was killed in a centre green accident in 1985.

The 1990s and early 2000s was a golden period for the club as they won five Polish team championships, ten Polish Pairs Speedway Championships and eight individual championships (six of them won by Tomasz Gollob). In 1991, Tony Rickardsson and Peter Karlsson became the first foreign riders for the club.

In 2007, the team was relegated from the top division for the first time in their history and the club underwent a period of mediocrity. In 2019 the team won the 2. Liga.

Teams

2023 team
 Kenneth Bjerre
 David Bellego
 Andreas Lyager
 Benjamin Basso
 Daniel Jeleniewski
 Oļegs Mihailovs
 Wiktor Przyjemski
 Bartosz Glogowski
 Szymon Szlauderbach
 Olivier Buszkiewicz
 Tomasz Gąsior
 Bartosz Nowak

Previous teams

2007 Team

 Statistics in 2007 Speedway Ekstraliga 

2008 Team

2012 Team

2022 team

 Kenneth Bjerre
 Benjamin Basso
 Matej Žagar
 Oļegs Mihailovs
 Daniel Jeleniewski
 Adrian Miedziński
 Wiktor Przyjemski
 Przemyslaw Konieczny
 Bartosz Glogowski

Competitions

Speedway Grand Prix
Polonia Bydgoszcz hosted the Speedway Grand Prix of Poland in the Polonia Bydgoszcz Stadium (1998–99, since 2001). In 2000 Polonia hosted Speedway Grand Prix of Europe. Tomasz Gollob won in Bydgoszcz SGP 6 times.

Pomeranian-Kuyavian Derby
The Pomeranian-Kuyavian Derby is the name given to speedway matches between Polonia Bydgoszcz and Unibax Toruń.

Criterium of Aces

The Mieczysław Połukard Criterium of Polish Speedway League Aces usually referred to as the Criterium of Aces (Kryterium Asów) is an annual speedway event held each year, which is organized by the Polonia Bydgoszcz.

The Criterium of Aces is held in the Polonia Stadium in Bydgoszcz. It is seen by riders and fans as the official opening of the new season. It was first staged in 1982, although a similar meeting was held in the 1951 as Criterium of Aces (Criterium Asów). The most successful rider in Criterium history is Tomasz Gollob (former Polonia's rider). He won Criterium 14 times between 1990 and 2008.

Honours

Stadium 

The stadium is located on ulica Sportowa 2 (Sports Street). It contains 20,000 seats. The track is 348 metres long and has a granite surface. The track record was made by Tomasz Gollob (60.11 sec on June 20, 1999).

Football section 
Polonia Bydgoszcz's football section competes in the regional league. Their home ground is Stadion Miejski im. Józefa Piłsudskiego.

References 

 
Bydgoszcz
Sport in Bydgoszcz